The Koci Cliffs are arcuate cliffs,  high, standing  south of Colwell Massif in Victoria Land, Antarctica. The cliffs trend west-southwest–east-northeast across the head of Waddington Glacier and locally mark the divide between glaciers flowing north to Ferrar Glacier or south to Skelton Glacier.

The feature was named by the Advisory Committee on Antarctic Names (1994) after Bruce R. Koci of the Polar Ice Coring Office, University of Nebraska–Lincoln, an authority in ice drilling with broad experience for many years in Antarctica and Greenland. He provided support to the Antarctic Muon and Neutrino Detection Array at the South Pole, 1993–2001, and to other parts of the U.S. Antarctic Program through the 2004–05 field season.

References

Cliffs of Victoria Land
Scott Coast